Cyril Walker may refer to:

Cyril Walker (footballer) (1914–2002), English footballer
Cyril Walker (golfer) (1892–1946), English golfer
Cyril Walker (paleontologist) (1939–2006), British paleontologist